Atash was a Persian language right-wing newspaper which was published from 1946 to 1947 in Tehran, Iran.

History and profile
Atash was first published on 18 April 1946 as a weekly newspaper. The license holder and editor was Mehdi Mir Ashrafi who was elected to the Majlis during the premiership of Mohammad Mosaddegh. The paper was based in Tehran and frequently featured political satire and cartoons. Atash had a right-wing political stance and was the only outspoken publication at that period in Iran. It was also one of the fierce critics of Iranian Prime Minister Ahmad Qavam and his cabinet. 

Due to its critical approach Atash  was banned in May and July 1946. In October it was restarted, and its frequency was switched to daily. From that date it began to criticize the Russian policies adopted by the government which led to its suppression in December 1946 and in February 1947. The paper ceased publication in June 1947 following its final ban by the Qavam government. The official reason for the closure of Atash was the publication of the articles against the interests of the country.

References

1946 establishments in Iran
1947 disestablishments in Iran
Banned newspapers
Censorship in Iran
Defunct newspapers published in Iran
Defunct weekly newspapers
Iranian political satire
Newspapers published in Tehran
Newspapers established in 1946
Publications disestablished in 1947
Persian-language newspapers